Adrienn Orbán (born 1 October 1986) is retired a Hungarian handballer.

Career
Orbán started to play in the Balázs Béla ÁMK, following the path of likes Katalin Pálinger, Anita Görbicz, Renáta Mörtel and the Iváncsik brothers. Her first professional club was the Győri ETO KC, whom she won the Hungarian Youth Championship, but eventually failed to break into the first team, and after a short loan spell in Győrújbarát she switched to second division side Komáromi AC. However, just after one season, she found herself in the top division again, since Váci NKSE secured her services. In Vác she developed into a quality player and at the end of the 2008–2009 season Győri ETO KC re-signed their former player as a backup of Katarina Mravíková.

She made her international debut on 3 March 2009 against Slovenia on the Pannon Cup. In the same year, she was member of the team which finished ninth on the World Championship. Orbán played in seven games and scored five goals.

Achievements
Nemzeti Bajnokság I:
Winner: 2005, 2010, 2011, 2012, 2013, 2014, 2016
Magyar Kupa:
Winner: 2010, 2011, 2012, 2013, 2014, 2015, 2016
EHF Champions League:
Winner: 2013, 2014, 2017
Finalist: 2012, 2016
Semifinalist: 2010, 2011
World University Championship:
Winner: 2010

References

External links
Adrienn Orbán player profile on Győri Audi ETO KC Official Website
Adrienn Orbán career statistics at Worldhandball

1986 births
Living people
Sportspeople from Győr
Hungarian female handball players
Győri Audi ETO KC players